Anolis microlepidotus, the Guerreran oak anole, is a species of lizard in the family Dactyloidae. The species is found in Mexico.

References

Anoles
Reptiles described in 1954
Endemic reptiles of Mexico